Savalia is a genus of anemone-like anthozoans in the order Zoantharia.

Species
The World Register of Marine Species recognizes the following two species:

 Savalia lucifica (Cutress C.E. & Pequegnat W.E., 1960)
 Savalia savaglia (Bertoloni, 1819)

References

Parazoanthidae
Hexacorallia genera